Sod's law, a British culture axiom, states that "if something can go wrong, it will". The law sometimes has a corollary: that the misfortune will happen at "the worst possible time" (Finagle's law). The term is commonly used in the United Kingdom, though in North America, the phrase "Murphy's law" is more popular.

The phrase seems to derive, at least in part, from the colloquialism an "unlucky sod"; a term for someone who has had some bad (unlucky) experience, and is usually used as a sympathetic reference to the person.

A slightly different form of Sod's law states that "the degree of failure is in direct proportion to the effort expended and to the need for success." 

An alternative expression, again in British culture, is "hope for the best, expect the worst".

Comparison with Murphy's law 
According to David J. Hand, emeritus professor of mathematics and senior research investigator at Imperial College London, Sod's law is a more extreme version of Murphy's law. While Murphy's law says that anything that can go wrong, will go wrong (eventually), Sod's law requires that it always go wrong with the worst possible outcome. Hand suggests that belief in Sod's law is a combination of the law of truly large numbers and the psychological effect of the law of selection. The former says we should expect things to go wrong now and then, and the latter says the exceptional events where something went wrong stand out in memory, but the great number of mundane events where nothing exceptional happened fall into obscurity.

Examples 

David Hand gives the example of traffic lights turning red when a driver is in a hurry, or email software crashing at the exact moment the user attempts to send an important message. Applied to individuals, he describes it as "Sod's law" that the composer Beethoven lost his hearing, and that drummer Rick Allen lost an arm in a car crash. Hand sees the law as an example of selection bias and the law of truly large numbers.

Richard Dawkins gives a simple example of a coin toss resulting in tails, the more strongly that one wishes the result to be heads. He uses this example to show that the idea of Sod's law is "nonsense", as the coin is unaware of the person's wish and has no desire to thwart it.

See also 
 Finagle's law

References

External links
 Michael Scannell, The basic laws (Murphy’s and Sod’s), a clear explanation of the difference.

Adages